A dermatofibroma, or benign fibrous histiocytomas, is a benign nodule in the skin, typically on the legs, elbows or chest of an adult. It is usually painless.

It usually ranges from 0.2cm to 2cm in size but larger examples have been reported. It typically results from mild trauma such as an insect bite. Risk factors for developing multiple dermatofibromas include lupus, HIV, blood cancer and some medicines that weaken immunity.

It is usually diagnosed by its appearance, but a biopsy may be required. Other bumps such as granular cell tumor, melanoma, clear cell acanthoma and dermatofibrosis lenticularis disseminata may look similar. Usually no treatment is needed. It can remain unchanged for years but can resolve spontaneously.

Signs and symptoms
Dermatofibromas are hard solitary slow-growing papules (rounded bumps) that appear in a variety of colours, usually brownish to tan. They are often elevated or pedunculated. A dermatofibroma is associated with the dimple sign; by applying lateral pressure, there is a central depression of the dermatofibroma. Although typical dermatofibromas cause little or no discomfort, itching and tenderness can occur. Dermatofibromas can be found anywhere on the body, but most often they are found on the legs and arms. They occur more often in women; the male to female ratio is about 1:4. The age group in which they most commonly occur is 20 to 45 years.

Some physicians and researchers believe dermatofibromas form as a reaction to previous injuries such as insect bites or thorn pricks. They are composed of disordered collagen laid down by fibroblasts. Dermatofibromas are classed as benign skin lesions, meaning they are completely harmless, though they may be confused with a variety of subcutaneous tumours. Deep penetrating dermatofibromas may be difficult to distinguish, even histologically, from rare malignant fibrohistocytic tumours like dermatofibrosarcoma protuberans.

Dermatofibromas typically have a positive buttonhole sign, or central dimpling in the center.

Diagnosis

Immunohistochemical staining

See also
 Acrochordon, also called skin tags
 Dermatology
 List of cutaneous conditions
 Seborrheic keratosis

References

External links 

Dermal and subcutaneous growths